In Ireland Counties are divided into civil parishes and parishes are further divided into townlands. The following is a list of parishes in County Tyrone, Northern Ireland:

 

A
Aghaloo, Aghalurcher, Arboe, Ardstraw, Artrea

B
Ballinderry, Ballyclog, Bodoney Lower, Bodoney Upper

C
Camus, Cappagh, Carnteel, Clogher, Clogherny, Clonfeacle, Clonoe

D
Derryloran, Desertcreat, Donacavey, Donaghedy, Donaghenry, Donaghmore, Dromore, Drumglass, Drumragh

E
Errigal Keerogue, Errigal Trough

K
Kildress, Killeeshil, Killyman, Kilskeery

L
Learmount, Leckpatrick, Lissan Longfield East, Longfield West

M
Magheracross

P
Pomeroy

T
Tamlaght, Termonamongan, Termonmaguirk, Tullyniskan

U
Urney

See also
List of townlands in County Tyrone

References

 
Tyrone
Civil parishes